Memry Savanhu (also Memory Savanhu) is a Zimbabwe-born Nollywood actress, filmmaker and entrepreneur, permanently resident in Lagos, Nigeria after a relocation from London, UK. She made her debut in the film, Distance Between, in 2008 and had since then, starred in a number of Nollywood features such as One Fine Day, On Bended Knees and '76. She is the founder of Memkay Productions, a film production outfit.

Life and education
Savanhu was reportedly born in Zimbabwe and revealed to Nigerian Guardian Newspaper that she is of Zezuru ethnicity. She studied drama in London and at the New York Film Academy in Abu Dhabi, UAE studied filmmaking.

Career
Savanhu had her earliest film production directed by Izu Ojukwu titled, Distance Between, in 2008 featuring Rita Dominic, Mercy Johnson, Kalu Ikeagwu and Yemi Blaq. Among her subsequent notable productions are One Fine Day, Cougars Reloaded, Catwalq and On Bended Knees. She was featured as "Eunice" in Izu Ojukwu's 2016 historical war drama, '76. Also featured were: Rita Dominic, Ramsey Nouah, Chidi Mokeme, Ibinabo Fiberesima and Daniel K. Daniel. The film had its premiere in Nigeria on November 3, 2016.

In 2014, she was nominated in the "Best Actor UK Female" category of the global Zulu African Academy Awards (ZAFAA), held in London, UK for her role in the film, Maria's Vision.

In 2015, she was nominated for the Zimbabwe International Women's Awards (ZIWA) held in Birmingham, UK in October of that year as reported by The Herald of Zimbabwe. This award is for her contribution to the Nollywood, according to Youth Village.

Filmatography

Film

Television series

Accolades

Personal life
Pulse Nigeria gathered that Savanhu is divorced and has two children.

References

External links
 Memry Savanhu on IMDb
 Memry Savanhu on Flixanda
 Memry Savanhu on Nollywood Reinvented.
 Zimbabwean-born Actress ‘Memry Savanhu’, based in London Relocated Fully to Lagos, Nigeria to act in Nollywood Films – Check Out Her Photos! on Golden Icon
 Memry Savanhu on Search.co.zw
 Jara: Memry Savanhu on Africa Magic

Year of birth missing (living people)
Living people
Nigerian actresses
Zimbabwean actresses
Zimbabwean filmmakers